The longjaw minnow (Ericymba amplamala) is a species of cyprinid fish that is endemic to the United States.

References 

Ericymba
Fish of North America
Freshwater fish of the United States
Fish described in 2006